Gloria Jharna Sarkar is a Bangladeshi politician and lawyer who is elected as Member of 11th Jatiya Sangsad of Reserved Seats for Women.

She is the first ever Catholic Christian woman to be in the parliament.

Before her, only two Christian men were elected to parliament. Promode Mankin, a Catholic, was an MP between 2009 and 2014 as well as Social Affairs minister between 2009 and 2012. His son, Jewel Areng, was elected for the first time in 2016 in a by-election and re-elected in 2018 December's general election.

Political life 
She has a long history of student activism in Catholic associations and women's groups such as the Young Women's Christian Association, the Bangladesh Christian Association and the Bangladesh Hindu Buddhist Christian Unity Council.

She had been present and was wounded in the 21st August grenade attack on the meeting of Bangladesh Awami League where 24 people got killed and about 300 injured.

I am from a coastal area where people are neglected and struggle to survive. I will work for needy children, women and young people.

References

Living people
Awami League politicians
People from Khulna District
11th Jatiya Sangsad members
Women members of the Jatiya Sangsad
Bangladeshi women lawyers
Bangladeshi Christians
21st-century Bangladeshi women politicians
1979 births
21st-century Bangladeshi lawyers